Ultimate Toni Braxton, released in 2003, is the first greatest hits collection by R&B singer Toni Braxton. It features many of her greatest hits, and includes all the singles from her debut Toni Braxton and all but one of the singles from her second album Secrets. Her albums The Heat and More Than a Woman are fairly underrepresented, as only two and one songs are included from each album, respectively. The songs on Ultimate are not the actual album versions but radio edits, and the version of "Seven Whole Days" is live.

The album also includes two new songs, "Whatchu Need" (produced by Rodney Jerkins) and "The Little Things" (produced by R. Kelly). Toni's first single "Give U My Heart" (a duet with Babyface) that was included on the "Boomerang" soundtrack, and a remix of "Un-Break My Heart". There is also a Box Set edition of the album which contains six additional remixes. According to Billboard, the album has sold 400,000 copies as of May 2013. It was certified Gold in the UK, in July 2013.

Background and content 
After releasing four studio albums, the last, More Than a Woman (2002), was a chart disappointment, being her first studio album to not reach the Top 10 and to not produce any hit singles. Later, Braxton discovered she was pregnant with her second child, which led her label to not release any more singles and the promotion of the album was interrupted. Ultimately, her label decided to release a greatest hits compilation in 2003. The compilation titled Ultimate Toni Braxton was released on November 4, 2003 by Arista Records.

Songs 
The track list is composed of Braxton's 18 songs, with 15 being her biggest hits, since her debut single with Babyface, "Give U My Heart", from 1992, until her biggest hit to date, "Un-Break My Heart", from 1996. The album also features other hits of her career, such as "Love Shoulda Brought You Home", "Another Sad Love Song", "Breathe Again", "You're Makin' Me High", "He Wasn't Man Enough" and many more. The album also features two new tracks, "Whatchu Need", produced by Rodney "Darkchild" Jerkins, and "The Little Things", produced by R. Kelly. It also features a live version of "Seven Whole Days" and a remix of "Un-Break My Heart" on the regular edition. The "limited edition" of the album contains 2 discs, with the second disc featuring six remixes of her hits.

Critical reception 

Stephen Thomas Erlewine of Allmusic gave the compilation 4.5 out of 5 stars, writing that, "her 18-track hits collection works well even through her shifts in style -- she is a confident enough performer to sell both the slow romantic ballads and material that swings harder. That's not to say that there aren't some slow spots here -- the previously unreleased cuts are no great shakes, and sometimes the abundance of slow numbers makes things sound too samey -- but she was one of the top urban soul singers of the '90s, and this is the album that illustrates why."

Commercial performance 
The album charted very modestly on the Billboard 200 chart, only reaching number 119. However, it fared better on the Top R&B Albums chart, peaking at number 43. Even with the modest peak, the album managed to sell over 400,000 copies in the United States, as of 2013. In the UK, the album charted higher, peaking at number 23. In July 2013, the album was certified gold, for selling over 100,000 copies.

Track listing

Charts

Certifications

References

2003 greatest hits albums
Albums produced by Bryan-Michael Cox
Toni Braxton compilation albums